McKenna Lane Kelley (born April 15, 1997 in Houston, Texas) is a retired American artistic gymnast.

Early life 
McKenna Kelley was born on April 15, 1997 in Houston, Texas. She is the second of four children of Olympic gold medal gymnast Mary Lou Retton and former Texas Longhorns quarterback Shannon Kelley. Her older sister Shayla competed for the Baylor University Acrobatics and Tumbling team, her younger sister Skyla is a competitive cheerleader, and her younger sister Emma is set to join the University of Arkansas gymnastics team in 2020.

Career

Level 10 
Kelley placed 5th in the all-around at the 2013 J.O. Nationals in the Junior D age division. In 2014, she was the Nastia Liukin Cup co-champion with Mackenzie Brannan.

Kelley briefly trained as an elite gymnast and was invited to a few U.S. National team camps in 2015. She attended the USA Gymnastics training camp for the selection of the 2015 Pan American Games but did not make the team.

College

2016 
Kelley joined the LSU Tigers gymnastics team in the 2016 season. She specialized in the floor exercise, competing in 13 of 14 meets. At the SEC Championship, she posted a season-high score of 9.925 to help the Tigers win the team title; she also earned SEC All-Freshman honors.

At the Super Six team finals of the 2016 NCAA Gymnastics Championship, she contributed a score of 9.9 to the Tigers' second-place finish.

2017 
Kelley competed on floor exercise in all but two meets of the 2017 season, and also competed once on vault for a score of 9.825. She earned a career-high floor exercise score of 9.975 against George Washington and Iowa. She posted a score of 9.95 on floor exercise at the SEC Championships, earning the event title and contributing to the Tigers' team title.

At the Super Six team finals of the 2017 NCAA Gymnastics Championship, she contributed a score of 9.9 on the floor exercise to help the Tigers earn another second-place finish. She earned first team All-America honors on the floor exercise.

2018 
Kelley did not compete in the 2018 season due to an Achilles tendon injury she suffered during a preseason training session.

2019 
In addition to floor exercise, Kelley competed regularly on vault and three times on balance beam during the 2019 season. She posted season-high scores of 9.925 on the vault against Missouri and 9.85 on the balance beam at Kentucky. On March 8, she earned her first career perfect 10 on the floor exercise against Oregon State, earning SEC Specialist of the Week honors. At the SEC Championships, she posted scores of 9.9 on the vault and the floor exercise to help the Tigers to another team title.

In the team finals of the 2019 NCAA Gymnastics Championship, Kelley contributed scores of 9.8875 on the vault and 9.95 on the floor exercise to help earn another second-place team finish for the Tigers. She earned second team All-America honors on the floor exercise.

Having missed an entire season due to injury, Kelley was eligible to take a redshirt year but instead opted to retire and end her career after her senior season.

Personal life 
McKenna lives in Cedar Park, Texas, United States.

References

1997 births
Level 10 gymnasts
American female artistic gymnasts
Sportspeople from Houston
Gymnasts from Texas
Living people
LSU Tigers women's gymnasts
NCAA gymnasts who have scored a perfect 10
Kelley family